Brett Donald Cameron (born 4 October 1996) is a New Zealand rugby union player. He made his debut for the New Zealand national side, the All Blacks, on 3 November 2018 as a substitute in the Test match against Japan in Tokyo.

References

External links
 

New Zealand rugby union players
1996 births
Living people
Lincoln University (New Zealand) alumni
New Zealand international rugby union players
Canterbury rugby union players
Crusaders (rugby union) players
Rugby union players from Whanganui
People educated at Cullinane College
Rugby union fly-halves
Manawatu rugby union players
Kamaishi Seawaves players
Hurricanes (rugby union) players